Latin Pop Albums is a record chart published in Billboard magazine that features Latin music sales information in regards to Latin pop music. The data is compiled by Nielsen SoundScan from a sample that includes music stores, music departments at electronics and department stores, Internet sales (both physical and digital) and verifiable sales from concert venues in the United States.

Number-one albums

References
General

 For information about each week of this chart, follow this link; select a date to view the top albums for that particular week

Specific

Pop 2020s
United States Latin Pop Albums
2020s
2020s in Latin music